Ninth is the ninth solo album, and eighth studio album, by English musician Peter Murphy. Produced by David Baron, the album was released on 7 June 2011 on Nettwerk Records. The first single from the album was "I Spit Roses" coupled with "The Prince & Old Lady Shade", which was released 22 March 2011. The second single, "Seasaw Sway", was also released in 2011.

Background
Speaking with the Los Angeles Times about the album, Murphy said "The whole intention was to really reference that spark and crackle of people playing together in a room. It's about time I reclaimed my legacy . . . It's going 'OK, this is how it's done.' You don't have to spend three years and $4 million on an album. Listen to this. It's full of swagger and immediacy." Speaking with Wired News Murphy described the album as "a continuation of the Go Away White trajectory, it has testosterone pouring out of it. At the same time, it's as beautiful as any female siren."

Critical reception 
Upon its release, Ninth received positive reviews from music critics. At Metacritic, which assigns a normalized rating out of 100 to reviews from critics, the album received an average score of 65, which indicates "generally favorable reviews", based on 9 reviews. The Allmusic review by David Jeffries awarded the album 4 stars stating "It's all put together in a right-sized package, too, with no filler to speak of, then wrapped in warm production from David Baron, who finds the proper balance of shadows and light. "The Godfather of Goth" sounds like the genre's savior here, coming on strong with those Bowie-sized aspirations and nailing that attractive Nosferatu-meets-Art-School style." Writing for PopMatters, critic Maria Schurr said "Ninth has a few overindulgently drony moments, but for the most part it is a virile return to form." Consequence of Sound critic David Buchanan said "the album's music lingers in a sonic age when Joy Division still reigned supreme." Critic Jeff Miers said "The first thing you notice about the album is the visceral power of the recording, which producer David Baron has configured as both fittingly modern and timelessly post-rock." in a review for the Buffalo News of New York. Michael Christopher of The Phoenix stated: "Ninth provides a dose of gloom so savory it would bring tears of overwrought emotion to the eyes of contemporaries like Robert Smith and Andrew Eldritch, though it's not exactly a nostalgia trip — more like grown-up melancholy with an aggressive rock streak." while also describing the album as "a striking return to form."

Nevertheless, Jason Heller of The A.V. Club had a mixed opinion on the album, commenting: "Where his menace once oozed, though, it now hiccups." Mojo also described the album as "his most conventional and, frankly, dull album, pursuing a plodding take on alt rock, in the uninteresting middle ground between early U2 and Stiltskin, with occasional dashes of doom-lite."

Track listing 
All lyrics written by Peter Murphy; all music composed by Peter Murphy and David Baron, except where noted.

"Velocity Bird" – 2:53
"Seesaw Sway" – 4:15
"Peace To Each" – 3:40
"I Spit Roses" – 4:03
"Never Fall Out" (Murphy, Paul Statham) – 4:09
"Memory Go" – 4:03
"The Prince & Old Lady Shade" – 4:44
"Uneven & Brittle" (Murphy, Mark Gemini Thwaite) – 4:48
"Slowdown" – 3:51
"Secret Silk Society" – 4:09
"Crème de la Crème" – 5:28

Personnel 

Peter Murphy – vocals, lyrics, arrangement

Additional musicians
 John Andrews - acoustic guitar, electric guitar
 Mark Gemini Thwaite - electric guitar
 Jeff Schartoff - infinite bass guitar
 Nick Lucero - drums
 Darrett Adkins - cello (5, 7, 11)
 Kenji Bunch - viola (5, 7, 11)
 Antoine Silverman - violin (5, 7, 11)
 Cornelius Dufallo - violin (5, 7, 11)
 Kerem Özyeğen - additional guitar (10)

Technical personnel
 David Baron - production, keyboards
 John Siket - engineering, mixing
 Alan Wolmark - management
 Fred Kevorkian - mastering
 Thomas Tadeus Bak - artwork, photography, design

Chart positions
Album

References 

2011 albums
Peter Murphy (musician) albums
Nettwerk Records albums